Rhynchospora inexpansa, commonly called nodding beaksedge, is a species of flowering plant in the sedge family (Cyperaceae). It is native to North America, where it is found in the southeastern United States and West Indies. Its typical natural habitat is in moist meadows, flatwoods, and pond edges. It is a weedy species that responds positively to ecological disturbance.

Description
Rhynchospora inexpansa is a tufted perennial, with flexuous stems that droop at the tip. The cespitose plant reaches  in height. The arching and drooping culms are slender and ribbed. The leaves exceed the culms. The inflorescences consist of clusters of three to six spikelets progressively spaced further away from each other. The spikelets are narrow and elongated, and the leafy bracts are slender and exceed the clusters. The flowers have six perianth bristles that exceed the tubercle and are antrorsely barbellate.

It fruits from June to October.

References

inexpansa
Flora of North America
Plants described in 1805